The list of shipwrecks of the Isles of Scilly is a list of ships which sank on or near the Isles of Scilly.

The list includes ships that sustained a damaged hull, which were later refloated and repaired.

Before 1601

1305
 an unnamed sailing vessel wrecked on Tresco. The Coroner, William le Poer, on the island to take charge of the salvaged cargo, was ″seized by the mob″ led by Randulph de Blancminster, Lord of the Manor, and imprisoned until he was able to purchase his freedom.

1555
 unidentified Spanish or Spanish–Netherlands vessel on Bartholomew Ledge. The oldest wreck site in the Isles of Scilly protected under the Protection of Wrecks Act 1973.

1597
 February – the Spanish Fleet of Indies galleon San Bartolomé   was lost within the Isles of Scilly. She was carrying lead ingots and fragments of bronze bells. (Note: may refer to 1555 wreck above.)

1601–1700

1616 or 1617 
 a ship equipped by Sir Walter Raleigh at his own expense sank in a gale whilst outward bound to Guiana seeking gold. A small Elizabethan shipwreck fitting the size and description of this ship was found by Todd Stevens in St Marys Roadstead which could be the remains of this vessel- the Fly boat "Flying Joan".

1617 
 the pinnace Supply of the East India Company was driven aground on the Western Rocks whilst homeward bound from Bantam to London. Men and goods saved and she made a second voyage to Java in 1621 and reported as laid up, there, in 1623.

1636 
 24 March – sailing ship Gift of God of Kirkcaldy was wrecked.

1641 
 23 September – the Dartmouth based Merchant Royal foundered between Land's End, Cornwall and the Isles of Scilly.

1645 
 July – the Royalist vessel John ran ashore after a skirmish with three Parliamentary ships. She was the flagship of the pirate John Mucknell. For more information about this wreck Read the book 'Pirate John Mucknell' by Todd Stevens.

1651 
 Two unidentified Royalist frigates anchored under Hugh Hill (now the Garrison) and blockading St Mary's was driven ashore in a storm and thought to be total wrecks (not confirmed by research).

1665 
 18 January – while on her first voyage home from the Moluccas and Bantam to London, the East Indiaman ship Royal Oak ( British East India Company) was lost (probably) on Pednathise Head in the Western Rocks. Some of the crew managed to abandon ship and took to a ″low rock″ where they were rescued fifty-two hours later. She was carrying peppercorns, cloth and porcelain.

1667 
 22 December (first report) – three ships lost near Scilly.
 (first report) – unidentified vessel wrecked at an unknown location. A passenger complained that he was left on a rock for one or two days while the cargo was salvaged, saying "Valuing the goods more than my life".

1668 
 11 December – sixth-rate Hind lost on Crim rocks.

1670 
 21 August (first report) – "A great ship has been lost about the Scillies, the afterpart of a wreck has been found."

1680 
 11 January – East India Company ship Phoenix carrying white pepper and cloth wrecked on the Western Rocks. Much of the cargo was salvaged and sold on Scilly to Thomas Abney who paid £202 8s 1d for 269 pieces of Peerlongs. This is incorrect. The Phoenix sank near Bream ledge between the islands of Samson and Mincarlo. She was found and identified by Todd Stevens who lifted hundreds of gold and silver coins and 79 items of gold jewellery from the site.

1681 
 December – A cargo vessel wrecked off St Agnes. The lighthouse keeper on St Agnes was found guilty of negligence for being inattentive to the light and for plundering some of the cargo. This is incorrect. The lighthouse keeper was not found guilty he was exonerated of any wrong doing and the wreck was the Golden Lyon which now lies in shallow water between St Agnes western shore and the Menglow rock.

1686 
 February – Vereenigde Oostindische Compagnie ship, Prinses Maria sank in shallow water near Silver Carn, north of Santaspery Neck within the Western Rocks. King James II sent his yacht to salvage some of the cargo and in 1973 a diving team recovered real coins, iron cannon and timbers.

1701–1800

unknown year 
 a French seventy–four gun ship was wrecked on the Western Rocks whilst making an attempt to invade the islands, an accompanying frigate managed to evade the rocks and return to France.

1707 

 22 October – HMS Association, HMS Eagle, HMS Romney and HMS Firebrand (all  Royal Navy) with the loss of nearly 2,000 souls; HMS Phoenix ( Royal Navy) sustained a damaged hull but was later refloated and repaired (see Scilly naval disaster of 1707).

1720 
 a Dutch ship lost on Great Wingletang Rock, St Agnes along with her cargo and crew.

1727 
William and Mary from Jamaica

1730 
 a ship carrying wine from the Canary Islands was wrecked on or near Rosevean. The master and a crewman were lashed to a rock for three days before rescue.

1733 
 unknown ship carrying mahogany from the Bay of Honduras to London went ashore on Melledgan. Only the captain and one crew managed to get away on a raft and drifted to Kitten Rock, north of Gugh where they were picked up days later.

1736 
9 October – The Triumph from Jamaica carrying 500 hogshead of sugar and a large quantity of rum.

1737 
 a Dutch ship was wrecked in Wingletang Bay, St Agnes in a south-east gale. The master and one of the crew were lost.

1738 
 November – the Diana of Calais wrecked on Mincarlo.

1739 
 30 December – Mermaid of Plymouth wrecked on Crow Bar.

1742 
 9 March – Nancy carrying Bristol compound spirits, hemp, iron and gunpowder caught fire and blew up in New Grimsby. There was damage to several ships in the vicinity.

1743 
 13 July – Dutch East India Company cargo ship VOC Hollandia, on her maiden voyage and bound from Amsterdam to Batavia, wrecked on the Gunner Rock, near Annet with the loss of 276 souls. In 1971 Rex Cowan found the wreck, a large quantity of silver coins, along with bronze cannons and mortars.

1748 
 27 February –  ( Royal Navy} wrecked on the Seven Stones reef with the loss of one hundred lives in 1747.

1750 
 unknown date – a large unidentified sailing vessel lost in the Gilstone area.

1752 
 a Dutchman carrying cotton from Smyrna wrecked on Rosevean. There were no survivors.

1753 
 20 May – the Johanna stranded at Little Smith, St Agnes; accounts differ as to year of loss and voyage details. Either registered at (or left) Topsham for Swansea or from the Isle of Wight for Liverpool. or en route from South Shields to Liverpool.

1758 
 30 December – the Furnace bound for Gosport with a cargo of brandy, oil, prunes, rosin and pewter wrecked on Broad Ledge near Guther's Island. Most of her cargo was saved by locals and Custom officers.

1759 
 January – while bound for Barcelona from London and Falmouth the Vincento Farea was lost at Scilly.
 23 February – schooner Anna Adriana  wrecked at Scilly with the loss of her crew and cargo.

1760 
 a ″Dutchman″ was lost on the rock Biggal of Melledgan. She was carrying wine and paper.

1762 
 a French vessel was wrecked on Rosevean; six of the eighteen crew survived by clinging to floating timbers.

1764 
 a Dutch galliot carrying wine and brandy from Bordeaux to Hamburg wrecked on the Lethegus Ledge, St Agnes. Accounts vary from no lives lost to three lives lost.
 a vessel with coal for the beacon (St Agnes lighthouse) was wrecked on Burnt Island, St Agnes.

1767 
11 January  – Seahorse of Newcastle, John James, Master, bound from Cadiz to London, laden with currants, cream of tartar, Spanish wool and fustick, was wrecked near Old Grimsby

1771 
 an unidentified ship lost with all hands on Gugh (probably on the Cuckolds Ledge).

1773 
 25 September – snow Duke of Cumberland from Boston, Massachusetts carrying oil, lumber, deal and other timber to London wrecked north-east of St Helen's.

1774 
 1 February –  Royd of London was beached on rocks when she parted her cable. She was en route from Barcelona to Roscoff with brandy and wine.

1776 
 A galliot was driven ashore while on a journey from Bordeaux to Hamburg with a cargo of coffee, sugar, indigo and wine, which was salvaged and put under lock and key. They were consequently stolen by a number of men. A Custom House boatman was sentenced to transportation for seven years and two women were acquitted.

1780 
 31 August – brig Tryal of Bristol wrecked in Crow Sound en route from St Christopher with sugar.
 20 November – while carrying Portland stone to Dublin, Weymouth brig Charming Molly was stranded and lost on Bryher.

1781 
 3 March – brig Endeavour of Liverpool was beached and lost along with her cargo of herrings, coal, rum and brandy. She was bound for Portsmouth from her home port.
 an unidentified Venetian ship was wrecked on Crebawethan. She was out of Marseilles carrying Castille soap, wine almonds and oil for London. Eleven of her crew escaped the wreck by holding on to a mast which carried them to New Grimsby on Tresco.

1782 
 2 February – a British cargo ship the Lady Johanna wrecked at Little Smith, St Agnes. The cargo of cotton and rum was salvaged and taken to Plymouth whilst the wreck was sold and broken up. Note: this is a different ship to the wreck on Little Smith in 1753.
 14 July – cargo ship the Madonna de Carmine hit the Golden Ball Bar, west of St Helen's. Bound from Rotterdam to Smyrna with cloth, the crew sold some of the cargo in order to pay for their passage to Falmouth. No lives lost. A Scheduled Ancient Monument and also referred to as Madonna de Carminic.
 an unidentified Venetian ship was wrecked on Crebawethan. She was out of Marseilles carrying Castille soap, wine almonds and oil for London. Eleven of her crew escaped the wreck by holding on to a mast which carried them to New Grimsby on Tresco.

1783 
 24 January – brig Oldenburger carrying a general cargo from St Vincent to Ostend went ashore on Tresco in New Grimsby harbour.
 31 July – Agnetta wrecked.
 4 September – the Financier bound for London from Charlestown, Carolina with tobacco, rice and indigo hit rocks near Annet and sank. In the same hour the Nancy (see 1784 for a different ship) carrying sugar and rum from Jamaica was wrecked near St Agnes with no loss of life. A third, unnamed, ship was also believed to have been lost with all hands.
 25 November – while bound for Liverpool from Viborg with deals the Sophia of London stranded and sank.

1784 
 26 February – a New York transport vessel wrecked on the back of Bryher.
 26 February – the packet ship Nancy, carrying actress Ann Cargill and her young child, struck the Gilstone in the Western Rocks and sank in deeper water near Rosevear Ledges. Some of the crew and passengers took to a small boat which was dashed on Rosevear killing all aboard. In total 36 crew, 12 passengers, and 1 prisoner drowned. For lots more information on this wreck read book 'Ghosts of Rosevear' by Ed Cumming & Todd Stevens.
 31 December – the Aurora struck a sunken rock off Land's End and made it to the Isles of Scilly finally sinking in St Helen's Gap. Cargo salvaged and she was refloated.

1786 
 24 December – brigantine Duke of Cornwall of Penzance hit the Bartholomew Ledge and was beached on St Agnes. She was the Duke of Cornwall's private tin ship and was carrying a general cargo from London for Falmouth and Penzance, in the teeth of a violent gale. The crew were saved but little of her cargo was retrieved for the proprietors.
 24 December – brig  Betsy from Chester, and heading for London, was lost between the Bartholomew Ledge and Perconger, St Agnes. She was carrying lead blocks and empty casks.
 24 December – Dowson from Leverpool (Liverpool) lost on the Isles of Scilly in a gale.
 24 December – an unidentified sloop sank on the Isles of Scilly.
 24 December – an unidentified brig sank on the Isles of Scilly.

1788 
 7 June – an unnamed Virginian lost in the Gilstone area of the Western Rocks.

1789 
 24 March – Ann wrecked.

1790 
 5 June – brigantine Eagle of Charlestown carrying tobacco, rice and staves went ashore near St Agnes.
 8 July – the 28-gun, sixth rate, HMS Pegasus ( Royal Navy) ) went ashore on Annet and refloated on the flood tide undamaged.
 20 April – the Elizabeth of London with a cargo of salt from Alicante wrecked under Tinklers Hill, St Martin's. She was originally seen with a broken mainmast, smashed decking and rigging trailing astern and encircled the islands three times before beaching herself.

1791 
 April – Scilly pilot boat sunk off Old Town Bay with the loss of eleven men.

1797 
 10 January – Albion wrecked.
 September – The Lethe wrecked on Scilly Rocks.

1798 
 10 December  – HMS Colossus, ( Royal Navy) British naval vessel wrecked off Samson in St Mary's Roads. One sailor drowned.  For more information on this wreck read 'Wreck of Colossus' by Todd Stevens who discovered the stern of this wreck in St Marys Roadstead.

1801–1900

1901–1914

1901 
 22 June – four masted barque  of Liverpool struck the Crebinacks and drifted onto the Bishop's Rock where she foundered with several of the crew drowning. Two passengers and twenty-one of the crew made it on to the ship's boat which was piloted to St Mary's by the St Agnes lifeboat. This is incorrect. Falkland struck the Bishop Rock and sank about a mile to the north of it. She now lies on the south eastern corner of Flemmings ledge in 45meters of water.

1902 
 2 February – sailing ship  sunk off St Martin's Head with the loss of the crew despite attempts by the gig Emperor to save them. The Lofaro figurehead is currently in the Valhalla Museum on Tresco.

1903 
 17 June – Newcastle steamer   bound for Bastia from Liverpool was rammed in dense fog by Norwegian barque Magdelen 30 miles SSW. She lost her mizzen mast and was towed to Penzance by steam trawler Buckhound.
 20 September – barque Queen Mab of Glasgow was 105 days out of Punta Arenas when she struck the Spanish Ledges. She was bound for Falmouth, with fustic log-wood and had passed the Wolf Rock on the 18th but was forced back by a strong, easterly gale. She was holed as she sailed over the Spanish Ledges and was then piloted by the St Agnes gig O & M to anchorage off the southern tip of Samson. Found to be taking in water, and under tow by the island's packet steamer Lyonesse, she was escorted to harbour with the assistance of the St Mary's and the St Agnes (James and Caroline) lifeboats. Thirteen local men manned the pumps for over five hours, and she made it to Hugh Town where she grounded at the harbour entrance. She was salvaged and left, on tow, for Falmouth and Le Havre on 7 October.
 17 October – while entering Crow Sound on a journey from Glasgow to Nova Scotia with a general cargo, the Kilkeel hit the Hats. She was later refloated.

1904 

1906 
 3 June – steam-trawler Magdalene of Boulogne, despite passing on the wrong side of the buoy while entering St Mary's Roads to seek medical assistance for an injured member of crew, managed to miss the Bartholmew Ledges. When leaving for sea the following day she again took the wrong route and this time struck the Ledges and sank two hours later.
 5 June – steam-trawler General Roberts of Hull sank after taking on water in the fishing grounds north of St Martin. Her crew abandoned ship in the punt and rowed towards Round Island.
 22 July – 2126 ton King Line steamer  bound for Naples with a cargo of coal from Barry, was lost on the Hard Lewis rocks to the east of St Martin's.
 21 August – steam-trawler Grassholm damaged her bows on Great Minalto while trying to make anchorage during thick fog. She was on passage to Cardiff with fish. St Mary's Lifeboat Henry Dundas towed her to harbour.

1907 
 14 December – Thomas W. Lawson, the world's only seven-masted schooner going as bulk oil carrier in charter for the Anglo-American Oil Co. Bound for London from Philadelphia the huge schooner was caught in a northwest gale off the Isles of Scilly on 13 December 1907.  The captain and engineer were found the following day on South Carn in the Hellweather Rocks by a gig's crew which included the son of the pilot who was out searching for his father.

1909 
 14 August – the Plympton struck the Lethegus' Ledge off St Agnes in thick fog. All the crew were saved but a man and boy from Hugh Town were lost when the boat went down without warning as they were unloading the cargo of grain which she was carrying from Villa Constitution to Dublin via Falmouth.

1910 
 18 April – SS Minnehaha, first-class liner hit Scilly Rock off Bryher in dense fog. Later refloated with no loss of life.

1911 
 13 January – Georges of Auray was found, by the St Mary's lifeboat Henry Dundas on the 12th, at anchor near St Agnes with a light burning but no one on board. Out from Swansea for Trinite with 170 tons of coal she lost her sails in a gale and started to leak. Her crew abandoned and landed safely on St Agnes and she sank the next morning.
 26 March – steamship Setiembre struck The Hats in Crow Sound and sank. She was a total loss despite her crew dumping her cargo of iron-ore overboard in an attempt to refloat her. Her boiler can still be seen above low water.

1912 
 8 December – steamer Antonios lost on Old Bess with the loss of her crew. The wreck went unnoticed for three days until wreckage and thousands of oranges were washed up on St Agnes.

1913 

1914 
 23 June –  struck the Crim with a ″consignment of Belgium undesirables″ deported from the USA. The passengers were landed on St Mary's and later taken to Cornwall on the Lyonesse. The Gothland was refloated.

World War I

1915 

1916 
 18 May – armed auxiliary naval trawler  struck one of the Crim Rocks and was run ashore at Great Crebawethan becoming a total loss.
 November – Admiralty auxiliary supply ship  went ashore at the Giant's Castle, St Mary's whilst in ballast from Le Havre to South Wales. Several attempts to refloat her were unsuccessful.

1917 
 11 May – two ships were wrecked on the same day during heavy fog, the SS Italia, a steam collier was wrecked on the Great Wingletang Rock off St Agnes, and the SS Lady Charlotte, another collier, was lost, shortly before, at Porth Hellick on St Mary's. The Italia was carrying coal from Cardiff to Taranto and went aground at 15:30 and quickly sank. The only witness, a St Agnes girl was not believed and the wreckage that washed up was believed to belong to the Lady Charlotte. When the crew of the Italia reached St Mary's it was assumed that she had been torpedoed somewhere off the islands, as none of the crew could speak English. The Wingletang wreck was finally identified in 1964 when her serial number was found on the ship's patent log.
 5 October – schooner Annie F. Conlon was badly damaged by gunfire from a German submarine, and was towed to Crow Sound, where she began to break up. Her cargo of 455 casks of oil made £1,406 9s for her owners Marine Transport of Mobile, Alabama.
 6 December – USS Jacob Jones, American destroyer was hit in the stern by a torpedo while on convoy duty. She exploded killing her crew and sank within eight minutes 25 miles SE of the Bishop Rock.

1918 
 10 November – Admiralty tug Blazer struck the Garrison. All her crew of 24 survived.

1918–1939

1920 
 2 December – SS Hathor wrecked on the Lethurges to the south of St Agnes. After breaking down near the Azores she was taken under tow by two German tugs who abandoned her in a gale off Scilly after the tow broke. Her crew was saved by lifeboat Elsie ( Royal National Lifeboat Institution). She lies on the wreck of the Plympton which sank on 14 August 1909.

1921 
 11 July – SS The Western Front foundered several miles west of the Isles of Scilly when she caught fire after an explosion. She was carrying 7,000 tons of naval stores, including naphtha, turpentine and resin from Jacksonville to London. One member of crew lost his life.

1925 
 21 March – steam-trawler Cité de Verdun struck Rosevear in a snowstorm. The crew of thirty landed, lit a fire and sent distress signals which were answered by the St Mary's lifeboat, Elsie ( Royal National Lifeboat Institution). The nameboards of the trawler can still be seen in the Mermaid and Atlantic public houses on St Mary's.
 12 June – steam-trawler Europe of Boulogne struck Rosevear in fog. As the tide rose the trawler floated off the rocks and made for Dunkirk with slight damage.

1927 
 27 October – SS Isabo with a cargo of grain foundered on Scilly Rock, west of Bryher. Three small boats Czar, Ivy and Sunbeam saved thirty-one men. Conditions deteriorated by the time lifeboat Elsie ( Royal National Lifeboat Institution) arrived and she had to leave four men clinging to the rigging, returning the next day to pick them up along with one on the Scilly Rock. (The account of the rescue differs with twenty-eight or thirty-six men saved out of a crew of thirty-eight).
 26 December – sailing barge Daphne of Rochester was abandoned by her crew and foundered one mile east of St Mary's with her main sail lost. With her jib set she sailed on into Crow Sound and grounded on Tresco. Three days later she was towed to St Mary's as salvage, repaired and returned to Rochester.

1938 
 12 September – Pasteur, a fishing vessel from Camaret stranded on Hanjaque. She was a regular visitor to Scillonian and Cornish waters fishing for crayfish. She was refloated on the next high tide.

World War II

1939 
The 27 crew was rescued by the St Mary's Lifeboat ( Royal National Lifeboat Institution).

1944 
 20 June 1944 – HMS Warwick sunk off the islands by U-413.
 1 September 1944 – U-247, German U-boat
 18 December 1944 – U-1209, German U-boat hit the Wolf Rock while schnorkelling. Survivors picked up by Naval vessels.

1945 
 12 January 1945 – merchant ship torpedoed off Scilly.
 21 January 1945 – U-1199, German U-boat.
 24 February 1945 – Oriskany, fruit cargo ship.
 24 February 1945 – U-1208, German U-boat.
 11 March 1945 – U-681, hit either the Bishop Rock or the Crebinicks. She was badly damaged, tried to make for a neutral port in Ireland but was attacked by an American Liberator plane.

1946–2000

1949 
 6 October – the 6,300 ton  (or ) of the Elder Dempster Line, en route from West Africa to Liverpool via Amsterdam and carrying a cargo of hardwood, palm kernels, palm oil, cocoa, rubber, cotton, coffee beans and copal struck the Seven Stones reef in dense fog. The 53 crew and passengers managed to launch the ship's two lifeboats and many of the mahogany logs were salvaged by local boatman.

1951 
 10 September – the Isles of Scilly packet steamer SS Scillonian ran ashore on the Wingletang Rock in fog. She was later refloated and continued in service. The 54 passengers were taken to Hugh Town by the company launch Kittern which went ashore on Rat Island damaging her rudder before finally making it to harbour.

1955 
She was en route from Hampton Roads to Rotterdam with 9,000 tons of coal. The captain was initially reluctant to leave his ship and twenty-five crew were saved by the St Mary's lifeboat Cunard. A Scheduled Ancient Monument. 
 22 July 1955 – Panamanian registered steamer  drove onto the Seven Stones reef and was abandoned by her crew. She filled and sank soon afterwards.

1961 
 9 March – trawler Petit Jean Yves went aground near Cuckolds Carn, Gugh. She was refloated the next day with the help of the St Mary's lifeboat ( Royal National Lifeboat Institution).

1967 
 18 March - oil tanker Torrey Canyon struck Pollard's Rock on Seven Stones reef, 7 mi (11 km) east-northeast (ENE) of Scilly, causing an environmental disaster and the largest oil spill in UK waters to date.

1970 
 25 February – channel trawler Jean Gougy was lost on the Western Rocks. The exact location is unknown, but wreckage and a body were washed up on Tresco. The other thirteen crew were never found. 
 15 April – the MV Poleire transporting zinc ore to Poland was wrecked on the Little Kettle Rock north of Tresco, and rapidly sank.

1976 
 29 September – the fish factory ship Rarau was wrecked on the Seven Stones, where she later sank, although the crew were all rescued.

1977 
 13 February – St Malo trawler Enfant du Bretagne was lost on Pednathise, within the Western Rocks at night. The lifeboat came within hearing distance of the crew, but all drowned in the heavy seas before they could be brought aboard.

1979 
 August – Fastnet race, many racing yachts sank in extreme weather

1997 

 26 March – , German-owned cargo ship wrecked at Newfoundland Point, St Mary's. She was en route to Ireland and on automatic pilot whilst the crew slept. The St Mary's lifeboat took all nine Polish crew ashore.

Since 2001

2005 
4 July – trawler Sauveterre sank sixty miles off the Isles of Scilly

See also 

 List of disasters in Great Britain and Ireland by death toll
 List of shipwrecks of Cornwall
 List of shipwrecks of the Seven Stones Reef
 List of U-boats of Germany
 Lists of shipwrecks
 1983 British Airways Sikorsky S-61 crash – helicopter crash off the Isles of Scilly

References

Further reading 
Arlott, John (1972) Island Camera: the Isles of Scilly in the photography of the Gibson family; in collaboration with Rex Cowan and Frank Gibson. Newton Abbot: David & Charles 
Du Boulay, Juliet (1959) "Wrecks of the Isles of Scilly", in The Mariner's Mirror; 1959
Larn, Richard & Carter, Clive (1969) Cornish Shipwrecks. 3 vols. Newton Abbot: David & Charles, 1969–71
Noall, Cyril (1968) Cornish Lights and Shipwrecks. Truro: D. Bradford Barton
Scilly Museum Shipwrecks Around the Isles of Scilly.
Vivian, John (1969) Tales of the Cornish Wreckers. Truro: Tor Mark Press
Cumming, Ed  (2010) Shipwreck & Ship Incidents. www.scillypedia.co.uk
 Larn, Richard & Carter, Clive (1993) Shipwrecks of the Scilly Isles. Shipwreck & Marine. .
 Fowles, John (1974) Shipwreck; photography by the Gibsons of Scilly. London: Jonathan Cape 
 See further literature and details: ScillyMaritime.co.ukShipwrecks UK

Shipwrecks
Scilly
 List of shipwrecks of the Isles of Scilly